Coryanthes, commonly known as bucket orchids, is a genus of neotropical epiphytic orchids (family Orchidaceae).  This genus is abbreviated as Crths in horticultural trade. They are native to South America, Central America, Mexico and Trinidad.

Bucket orchids are an excellent example of coevolution and mutualism, as the orchids have evolved along with orchid bees (the tribe Euglossini of the family Apidae) and both depend on each other for reproduction. One to three flowers are borne on a pendant stem that comes from the base of the pseudobulbs. The flower secretes a fluid (see Coryanthes alborosea picture) into the flower lip, which is shaped like a bucket. The male orchid bees (not the females) are attracted to the flower by a strong scent from aromatic oils, which they store in specialized spongy pouches inside their swollen hind legs, as they appear to use the scent in their courtship dances in order to attract females. The bees, trying to get the waxy substance containing the scent, sometimes fall to the fluid-filled bucket. As they are trying to escape, they find that there are some small knobs on which they can climb on, while the rest of the lip is lined with smooth, downward-pointing hairs, upon which their claws cannot find a grip. The knobs lead to a spout (see the Coryanthes leucocorys picture), but as the bee is trying to escape, the spout constricts. At that same moment, the small packets containing the pollen of the orchid get pressed against the thorax of the bee. However, the glue on the pollen packets does not set immediately, so the orchid keeps the bee trapped until the glue has set. Once the glue has set, the bee is let free and he can now dry his wings and fly off. His ordeal may have taken as long as forty-five minutes. Hopefully for the orchid, the bee will go to another Coryanthes flower, where, if the flower is to be successful at reproducing, the bee, displaying more enthusiasm than wisdom,  falls once again into the bucket of another flower of  the same species. This time the pollen packets get stuck to the stigma as the bee is escaping, and after a while the orchid will produce a seed pod.  These flowers are among the largest in the Orchid Family.  According to Kupper and Linsenmaier some species can be up to twelve inches (30 centimeters) wide and 6.5 inches (16 centimeters) top to bottom.   C. bruchmuelleri is generally regarded as the largest species, as even the unopened buds can be 4.6 inches (11.7 centimeters long by 3 inches (8 cm) in width.   

The bee, having stored the aromatic oils in his back legs, can then fly off to mate with a female bee.

History
Some of the first investigations on Coryanthes were published by Cruger in 1865.
Charles Darwin describes his observations and experiments on some species of Coryanthes in his book The Various Contrivances by which Orchids are Fertilized by Insects. However, Darwin thought it was the female bees that were doing the fertilizing, and it was almost 100 years before the role of the male euglossine bees were revealed in 1961.

Intergeneric hybrids
 Coryhopea (Coryanthes × Stanhopea)

Gallery

References

External links
 
 
  (1831) Botanical Magazine 58: t. 3102. 
  (2009) Epidendroideae (Part two). Genera Orchidacearum 5: 407 ff. Oxford University Press.
 Photo collections of Coryanthes from Botanical Garden Munich 

 
Stanhopeinae genera